Mount Powell is the highest summit of the Gore Range in the Rocky Mountains of North America. Mount Powell was named in honor of John Wesley Powell who climbed to the summit in 1868.

Mountain
Mount Powell is very prominent when viewed from the north east, rising 6,000 feet above Green Mountain Reservoir.

See also

List of mountain peaks of North America
List of mountain peaks of the United States
List of mountain peaks of Colorado

Further reading
 Mike Garratt, Bob Martin, Colorado's High Thirteeners: A Climbing and Hiking Guide, PP 3-4
  Randy Jacobs, Robert M. Ormes, Guide to the Colorado Mountains, P 143

References

External links

Powell
Powell
Powell
Arapaho National Forest
White River National Forest
Powell